Jack Musk (born 4 March 2000) is an English rugby union player who plays for Harlequins in the Premiership Rugby.

References

External links
Harlequins Profile
ESPN Profile
Ultimate Rugby Profile

2000 births
Living people
English rugby union players
Harlequin F.C. players
Richmond F.C. players
Rugby union hookers
Rugby union players from Kingston upon Thames